Shahrokhi (Persian: شاهرخی) is an Iranian surname. Notable people with the name include:
Homayoun Shahrokhi (born 1946), Iranian football player and coach
Mahasti Shahrokhi, Iranian novelist and poet
Manuchehr Shahrokhi, American professor of global business and finance
Mehdi Shahrokhi (born 1985), Iranian shot putter 
Mehrab Shahrokhi (1944–1993), Iranian football player

Persian-language surnames